John Arthur Fullerton (May 12, 1912 – July 5, 1965) was a politician in Ontario, Canada. He was a Progressive Conservative member of the Legislative Assembly of Ontario from 1945 to 1963. He represented the riding of Algoma—Manitoulin.

Background
He was born in Thessalon, Ontario, the son of James Albert Fullerton, and educated there. In 1938, he married Marian Dobie. Fullerton was a furniture dealer and funeral director. He served on the town council and was also a master in the local Masonic lodge. He and Marian raised four children.

Politics
In 1945, Fullerton ran as the Progressive Conservative candidate in the northern Ontario riding of Algoma—Manitoulin. He defeated Liberal candidate J.F. McDermid by 419 votes. He was re-elected in 1948, 1951, 1955 and 1959.

In 1963, he was defeated by Liberal candidate Stan Farquhar by 1,644 votes. Fullerton attributed his loss to "free beer and cocktail parties" given out by the opposition. Others believed that the loss was due to a controversial relocation of a senior's residence that was to be built in Espanola but was instead moved to his own home town of Thessalon.

References

External links 

1912 births
1965 deaths
Canadian funeral directors
People from Algoma District
Progressive Conservative Party of Ontario MPPs